The El Abid River ( (Arabic for "Slaves' River") is a river in Morocco, near Douar El. It rises in the High Atlas Mountains and enters the Atlantic Ocean at Azemmour west of Casablanca.

See also 
 Oued El Abid, Tunisia

References 

Rivers of Morocco
International rivers of Africa